Elections to Liverpool Town Council were held on Friday 1 November 1867. One third of the council seats were up for election, the term of office of each councillor being three years.

Twelve of the sixteen wards were uncontested.

After the election, the composition of the council was:

Election result

Because of the large number of uncontested seats, these statistics should be taken in that context.

Ward results

* - Retiring Councillor seeking re-election

Abercromby

Castle Street

Everton

Exchange

Great George

Lime Street

North Toxteth

Pitt Street

Rodney Street

St. Anne Street

St. Paul's

St. Peter's

Scotland

South Toxteth

Vauxhall

West Derby

By-elections

No. 16, North Toxteth, 1 November 1867

Caused by the retirement of Councillor Edward Lawrence (Conservative, North Toxteth, elected 2 November 1865).

Aldermanic By Election, 4 April 1867

Following the death of Alderman James Parker, reported to the Council on 1 April 1868, John Weightman was elected as an alderman on 4 April 1868.

No. 5, Exchange, 22 April 1868

Caused by the death of Councillor William Barry (Liberal, Exchange, elected unopposed 1 November 1866) which was reported to the Council on 29 April 1868

No. 5, Exchange, June 1868

Caused by the resignation of Councillor John Swainson (Exchange, elected 1 November 1865), reported to the Council on 3 June 1868

See also

 Liverpool City Council
 Liverpool Town Council elections 1835 - 1879
 Liverpool City Council elections 1880–present
 Mayors and Lord Mayors of Liverpool 1207 to present
 History of local government in England

References

1867
1867 English local elections
November 1867 events
1860s in Liverpool